Love Is Magic is the fourth studio album by American musician John Grant. It was released via Bella Union on October 12, 2018.

Release
On July 10, 2018, Grant announced the release of his fourth album, alongside the title track "Love Is Magic". Grant said of the album: "Each record I make is more of an amalgamation of who I am. The more I do this, the more I trust myself, and the closer I get to making what I imagine in my head."

On August 28, 2018, two new singles – "He’s Got His Mothers Hips" and "Touch & Go" – were released.

The fourth single "Is He Strange" was released on October 3, 2018.

Tour
In support of the album, a tour was announced for the UK in October 2018 through to February 2019.

Critical reception

Love Is Magic was met with "generally favorable" reviews from critics. At Metacritic, which assigns a weighted average rating out of 100 to reviews from mainstream publications, this release received an average score of 78, based on 18 reviews. Aggregator Album of the Year gave the release a 77 out of 100 based on a critical consensus of 22 reviews.

Michael Cyrs from The 405 said the album is Grant's "most consistent and enjoyable work yet." and it "still showcases his trademark unpredictability. Soft love songs still turn sexual. Robotic voices are paired with Grant’s prettiest singing." Anna Byrne from The Line of Best Fit said the album is Grant's "fourth solo record released exactly three years after the last, and you experience his customary level of brutal honesty, irresistible vulnerability and wit – but with the electronics dialled way up. The specificity of the lyrics and the boldness of the electronic orchestration should theoretically preclude this – but Grant lets the emotions that drive them show through enough that you can’t help but connect."

Chart performance
The album charted at number 17 on the UK Official Albums Chart on October 25, 2018, and number 9 on the Scottish Albums Chart.

Accolades

Track listing

Personnel

Musicians
 John Grant – primary artist, vocals, piano, keyboard, producer
 Paul Alexander – guitar, keyboards, producer
 Scott Lee – bass
 Joey McClellan – guitar
 Daniel Creamer – keyboards
 Bobby Sparks – clavinet

Production
 Rhys Atkinson – design
 Matt Pence – engineer
 Craig Silvey – mixing
 Scott King – design
 Greg Calbi – mastering
 Jonathan de Villiers – photography

Charts

References

2018 albums
John Grant (musician) albums
Bella Union albums